JBT Corporation, or John Bean Technologies Corporation, is a global food processing machinery and airport equipment company. JBT Corporation was incorporated in 2008 when FMC Technologies divested its non-energy businesses. JBT Corporation is based in Chicago, Illinois. Its AeroTech division manufactures and services the Jetway brand of airport passenger loading bridges and other Ground Support Equipment such as Cargo Loaders, Deicers and pushback tractors. The company traces its history back to a company founded in 1884 by John Bean, an orchardist in Los Gatos, California.

History

The Bean Spray Pump Company
Founded in 1884 as the Bean Spray Pump Company in Los Gatos, California by orchardist John Bean. The company's first product was a piston pump, which Bean invented the pump to spray insecticide on the many fruit orchards in the area.  A Bean sprayer is on display at the Forbes Mill museum there.  Bean Avenue in downtown Los Gatos is named after John Bean.

FMC
In 1928, Bean Spray Pump purchased Anderson-Barngrover Co. and Sprague-Sells, and changed its name to Food Machinery Corporation, and began using the initials FMC. FMC received a contract to design and build landing vehicles tracked for the United States War Department in 1941. FMC also built the M113 (APC) Armored Personnel Carrier and the Bradley Fighting Vehicle as well as the XR311 at its former facility in Santa Clara, California. The troubled development of the Bradley was satirized in the 1998 HBO movie The Pentagon Wars.  In the movie FMC was fictionalized as A.O.C corporation. Bean also manufactured fire fighting equipment in the 1960s through the 1980s under the FMC and the Bean names.

FMC also produced fire truck fire pumps and pumper bodies, and had an OEM arrangement with LTI (Ladder Towers Inc.) to market aerial ladders.  In the early 1980s the Fire apparatus division of FMC tried to expand its role in aerial ladders on fire trucks, leveraging the Link-Belt crane division. FMC was ultimately unsuccessful in its expansion into production of aerial ladders.  The FMC Fire Apparatus division was also ultimately shut down in 1990.

Spinoffs
In 1946, FMC bought out Bolens Lawn And Garden Equipment. FMC changed names again in 1948, becoming Food Machinery and Chemical Corporation. In 1961 the name was changed to FMC Corporation.

In 1967, the FMC Corporation merged with the Link-Belt Company. The company produced FMC Link-Belt branded cranes and excavators. In 1986, the Link-Belt Construction Equipment Company was formed as a joint venture between FMC Corporation and Sumitomo Heavy Industries.

Between 1965 and 1985 FMC was the owner of the Gunderson metal works in Oregon USA, during that period it was known as the 'Marine and Rail Equipment Division of FMC' (MRED), it was sold in 1985 to The Greenbrier Companies.

In the 1980s, 1990s, and 2000s (decade), FMC Corporation began spinning several of its divisions into separate companies, including United Defense and FMC Technologies, and selling its divisions, including the John Bean Company, now a subsidiary of Snap-on Equipment, a division of Snap-on. Bolens was sold to Troy Built in 1991.

On April 30, 2008, FMC Technologies announced the spinoff of its airport and food equipment businesses into a separate company named John Bean Technologies Corporation, headquartered in Chicago, Illinois.  JBT is named after the spray pump inventor whose business was the foundation of FMC Corp.

Acquisitions

2015

 September: A&B Process Systems - processing systems for the beverage and food industries 

2017

 February: Avure Technologies, Inc. - high pressure processing (HPP) systems 
 July: PLF International Limited - powder filling systems for the global food and beverage markets 

2018

 January: Schröder Maschinenbau KG - complementary protein processing equipment which JBT Wolf-tec has successfully distributed for many years

2019 

 June: Proseal - tray sealing technology for the food industry 

2021

 March: AutoCoding Systems - label inspection and verification software solutions
 June: Prevenio - innovative food safety solutions primarily for the poultry industry
 November: Urtasun - fruit and vegetable processing solutions

2022

 July: Alco-food-machines - further food processing solutions and production lines
 September: Bevcorp -  equipment and aftermarket support for the beverage processing and packaging market in the United States

Organization

JBT Corporation is organized in two business divisions: JBT FoodTech and JBT AeroTech.

JBT FoodTech sells products and services for food processing companies. Markets include food freezers, protein processing, in-container food processing, and fruit processing.

JBT AeroTech sells products and services to airport authorities, airlines, airfreight and ground handling companies. Products include ground support equipment and gate equipment.  Services include maintenance of airport equipment, systems and facilities. JBT AeroTech also supplies the United States military with equipment for cargo loading, aircraft towing, and aircraft cooling.

In addition, JBT Corporation has an automated guided vehicle (AGV) business focused on material handling in the automotive, food & beverage, manufacturing, printing, warehousing, and hospital industries.

References

Companies listed on the New York Stock Exchange
Manufacturing companies established in 2008
Companies based in Chicago
American companies established in 2008
2008 establishments in Illinois
American brands